The Quiz Show Scandal (lit. "Quiz King") is a 2010 South Korean film. The ensemble comedy satire is written and directed by Jang Jin.

At a police station, people involved in a car accident are accidentally informed of the answer to the last question of a quiz show with a prize of over ten million dollars. On the day of the show, those same people gather again to compete against each other but they only know the answer to the last question. Who is going to win the fortune?

Plot
Four cars are caught up in a pile-up on the Gangbyeon Expressway into Seoul one night when a young woman, Im Yeon-yi, seemingly throws herself into the traffic. In the first car are Do Ho-man (Song Young-chang), whose wife is in a coma in hospital, and his cockily brilliant student son, Ji-yong (Lee Ji-yong); in the second are a gambling-addicted husband, Kim Sang-do (Ryu Seung-ryong), his nagging wife Jang Pal-nyeo (Jang Young-nam) and their young daughter; in the third are two gangsters, Lee Do-yeob (Kim Su-ro) and Park Sang-gil (Han Jae-suk), who will "fix" anything for money; and in the last car are four members of a depression-therapy group - club president Kim Jeong-sang (Kim Byeong-ok), high-school student Kim Yeo-na (Shim Eun-kyung), French teacher Lee Sang-hoon (Lee Sang-hoon) and a mobile phone salesman (Lee Moon-soo). They are all taken to Yongsan police station to sort out what happened, and are joined by others brought in for questioning, including restaurant delivery boy Oh Cheol-ju (Ryu Deok-hwan) and a drunk, Lee Jun-sang (Im Won-hee). Everyone in the room learns that the dead woman set questions for the big-money TV program Quiz Show and that a memory stick in her bag contains the answer to the final question for next month's show. No one has ever succeeded in answering all 30 questions because of the legendary difficulty of the final one: the show's accumulated pot is currently US$10 million. They all hurriedly brush up their general knowledge to apply to take part in the show, and by the night in question the pot has climbed to US$13.5 million. What they don't realize, as the show goes to air live, is that the organizers are running their own private scam, and Lee Do-yeob has decided to "fix" things his own way.

Cast

Main cast
Kim Su-ro - Lee Do-yeob, the older gangster
Han Jae-suk - Park Sang-gil, the younger gangster
Song Young-chang - Do Ho-man
Jang Young-nam - Jang Pal-nyeo, Kim Sang-do's nagging wife
Ryu Seung-ryong - Kim Sang-do, the addictive gambler
Lee Ji-yong - Do Ji-yong, the know-it-all son
Ryu Deok-hwan - Oh Cheol-ju, the Chinese restaurant delivery boy
Lee Hae-yeong - Choi Ha-yeong, the quiz host
Kim Byeong-ok - Kim Jeong-sang, the depression club's president
Lee Sang-hoon - Lee Sang-hoon, the French teacher
Lee Moon-soo - the mobile phone salesman
Shim Eun-kyung - Kim Yeo-na, the depressive schoolgirl, aka "ShootMePlz"
Im Won-hee - Lee Jun-sang, the drunk
Jung Jae-young - Dong Chi-seng, the judo man (cameo)
Shin Ha-kyun - the Ph.D in engineering (cameo)
Go Eun-mi - Im Yeon-yi, the dead woman (cameo)

Supporting cast

Lee Su-yeong - the radio singer
Gong Ho-seok - Officer Gong
Kim Won-hae - Officer Kim
Kim Il-woong - Officer Choi
Han Seung-hee - Officer Han
Park Jeong-gi - Officer Park
Kim Dae-ryung - Kim
Park Jun-seo - Park
Kim Jae-geon - TV station general manager
Jo Deok-hyeon - TV director
Lee Cheol-min - academic
Jung Gyu-soo - academic
Lee Jae-yong - academic
Lee Han-wi - Kim, a businessman 
Jang Jin - Chief Inspector Ma
Park Geon-il as Kim
Kim Ji-yeong - female quiz show questioner
Bae Seong-il - male quiz show questioner
Lee Su-bin - Kim Sang-do's daughter
Lee Seon-hye - Park Pil-rye, the prostitute
Shin Hyeon-suk - wife
Yu Hee-seok - TV director's female assistant
Ahn Jang-hun - quiz show audition examiner
Shin Gyeong-in - TV weather girl
Ahn Min-yeong - group member
Lee Jong-pil - group member
Kim Mi-suk  - man's wife
Kim Shi-gweon - biker
Kim Bang-yul - bikers
Han Eul-hee - assistant producer
Han Su-jin - Choi Ha-yeong's woman
Kim Jun-yeong - French translator
Lee Dae-seung - Do Ji-yong's teacher
Park Sang-yeong  - Kim Yeo-na's teacher
Seo Ji-won - Kim Yeo-na's friend
Kim Chan-yi - detective
Go Seong-il - quiz show host on TV set
Lee Sang-il - Kim Jun-mo 
Son Yeol-jun - quiz show competitor on TV set
Jang Yong-bok - quiz show competitor on TV set
Kim Hae-ju - quiz show competitor on TV set
Yun Ju-man - quiz show competitor on TV set
Lee Geon-woo - quiz show competitor on TV set
Kim Jeong-gyo - quiz show competitor on TV set
Han Sang-gu - quiz show competitor on TV set
Kim Yong-gu - quiz show competitor on TV set
Jeong Seon-hye - quiz show competitor on TV set
Son Mun-sun - quiz show competitor on TV set
Kim Ji-seok - quiz show competitor on TV set
Kim Seon-chan - quiz show competitor on TV set
Lee Tae-woong - quiz show competitor on TV set
Kim Jae-ho - quiz show competitor on TV set
Hong Hyeon-cheol - quiz show competitor on TV set
Kim Ji-gyeong - quiz show competitor on TV set

References

External links
 https://web.archive.org/web/20120120202023/http://www.quizking2010.co.kr/
 Quiz King at Naver
 
 
 

South Korean comedy films
2010 films
Films directed by Jang Jin
2010s South Korean films